Mitski Miyawaki (born Mitsuki Laycock; September 27, 1990), known professionally by the mononym Mitski, is a Japanese-born American singer-songwriter. Mitski self-released her first two albums, Lush (2012) and Retired from Sad, New Career in Business (2013), while studying studio composition at Purchase College's Conservatory of Music. These albums were created originally as her senior project at Purchase. She released her third studio album, Bury Me at Makeout Creek, in 2014 through Double Double Whammy after graduating. 

Mitski then signed with Dead Oceans in 2015 and released her critically acclaimed albums Puberty 2 (2016), Be the Cowboy (2018) and Laurel Hell (2022), the last of which entered the top ten in several territories. In 2022, Ben Beaumont-Thomas of The Guardian dubbed her the "best young songwriter" in the United States. In 2022 she co-wrote "This Is a Life" from the film Everything Everywhere All at Once, which earned her an Academy Award nomination for Best Original Song.

Early life
Mitski Miyawaki was born Mitsuki Laycock on September 27, 1990, in Mie Prefecture, Japan to a White American father and a Japanese mother. Her first language was Japanese. She moved frequently while growing up due to her father's job at the United States Department of State, living in Turkey, China, Malaysia, the Czech Republic, and the Democratic Republic of Congo before settling in the United States. She sang in a choir in high school and was 18 when she wrote her first song on the piano.

Career

2012–2014: Lush; Retired from Sad, New Career in Business; and Bury Me at Makeout Creek

After enrolling at Hunter College to study film, Mitski decided to pursue music instead and transferred to SUNY Purchase College's Conservatory of Music, where she studied studio composition. During her time at Purchase, she recorded and self-released her piano-based first and second albums, Lush (2012) and Retired from Sad, New Career in Business (2013), as student projects. While there, Mitski met Patrick Hyland, who has produced her albums after Lush. In 2013, she collaborated with indie-rock artists Mike Rasimas and Mutsawashe Mangwendeza, providing vocals for the original song Ego and a cover of "Nightcall" by Kavinsky.

After graduating, she served as the vocalist for the short-lived prog-metal band Voice Coils and began work on her third studio album, Bury Me at Makeout Creek, which was released on November 11, 2014, through Double Double Whammy. The album was reissued with four bonus tracks on April 7, 2015, through Don Giovanni Records. The album's raw, impulsive guitar represented a sonic departure from the orchestral and classical piano sounds of her first two albums. It garnered acclaim from numerous publications.

2015–2017: Puberty 2

On December 22, 2015, Mitski signed with Dead Oceans. She announced her fourth studio album, Puberty 2, on March 1, 2016, and shared the lead single, "Your Best American Girl". She released another single, "Happy", before the release of the album on June 17. Produced by Hyland, the album was recorded over two weeks at Acme Studios in Westchester County, New York. The album received widespread acclaim from music critics. "Your Best American Girl" was named the 13th best song of the 2010s by Rolling Stone.

In a 2016 episode of the Cartoon Network show Adventure Time, her song "Francis Forever" was covered by Olivia Olson as the character Marceline the Vampire Queen.

On February 21, 2017, the Pixies announced U.S. tour dates with Mitski as a supporting act. On May 1, a compilation album consisting of 100 songs by various artists titled Our First 100 Days was released. It includes Mitski's cover of One Direction's song "Fireproof". The compilation aims to raise funds for organizations that support causes threatened by Donald Trump's proposed policies. Mitski played a cover of the song in 2015, but that version has since been taken down. Mitski also covered Frank Sinatra's 1951 classic "I'm a Fool to Want You" for the 7-Inches For Planned Parenthood compilation album. On October 4, 2017, Lorde announced that Mitski would open for her on some dates on her Melodrama World Tour. On November 1, a short film starring Mitski called Sitting was released.

2018–2019: Be the Cowboy

On April 20, 2018, Mitski teamed up with the experimental band Xiu Xiu on the song "Between the Breaths" for the soundtrack of the sci-fi comedy film How to Talk to Girls at Parties, based on the short story of the same name.

On May 14, 2018, Mitski opened pre-orders for her fifth studio album, Be the Cowboy, and released the lead single, "Geyser", with an accompanying music video. The second single and its video, "Nobody", was released on June 26, 2018, and the third and final single to precede the album, "Two Slow Dancers", was released on August 9 alongside a lyric video. Be the Cowboy was released on August 17, through Dead Oceans. It was critically acclaimed and named the album of the year by Pitchfork, Vulture and Consequence of Sound.

On tour in 2019, Mitski began incorporating choreography into her live performances inspired by Butoh, a form of dance theater developed in post-war Japan, in which "performers draw on chaotic internal emotions but depict them with precise, repetitive gestures." The approach reflected her wish to "give audiences something new" on her second headlining tour since Be the Cowboy's release, as well as a desire "to develop her own, idiosyncratic ways of maintaining a grip on an audience," since she'd learned "that the jumping around onstage, getting everyone pumped up, doesn’t come naturally to me." Mitski worked with performance artist Monica Mirabile to devise the tour's "highly stylized, sometimes unsettling" movements. Butoh influenced choreography was also used in her music video for "Working for the Knife".

In August 2019, Mitski ended her hiatus from social media to post a statement denying allegations made by a Tumblr user that she had been involved in a child trafficking ring: "I don't know the accuser, and I don't know how or why they have come to associate me with their trauma."

In September 2019 at the final performance of her Be the Cowboy Tour in Central Park, Mitski announced that it would be her last indefinitely. She later talked about how she planned to quit music completely and "find another life." By early 2020, Mitski had changed her mind and decided to return to music, partly because she owed her label another album and partly for herself. She described making the decision to continue, "What it came down to was, ‘I have to do this even though it hurts me, because I love ... This is who I am. … I’m going to keep getting hurt, and I’m still going to do it, because this is the only thing I can do.’ "

2020–present: Laurel Hell

Mitski shared her new song, "Cop Car", in January 2020, a never-released piece from the soundtrack of The Turning. She was featured in the song "Susie Save Your Love" from Allie X's album, Cape God, released in February 2020.

On October 29, 2020, it was announced that Mitski will provide the soundtrack to the graphic novel This Is Where We Fall. The sci-fi Western story written by Chris Miskiewicz and Vincent Kings "unpacks themes of theology, death, and the after-life". Of the project, Mitski said "It was exciting to make a soundtrack for a comic book, It allowed me to work outside of my usual songwriting form and try to approach it like a score, but without any of the cues that come with working alongside a moving image, which ended up being both freeing and challenging. I hope the end result helps to immerse you in the story!" A country song called "The Baddy Man" was released as the first preview from the soundtrack on March 5, 2021. Z2 Comics released the album on cassette with the standard hardcover novel on May 5, 2021. A limited edition deluxe vinyl was also released. At the moment, Z2 has no plans to put the soundtrack on streaming services.

On October 4, 2021, Mitski announced on her social media that she would be releasing a new single, "Working for the Knife", the next day as the lead single to her upcoming sixth studio album. The song would later be named the 7th best song of 2021 by Pitchfork. Soon after the song's release, Mitski announced her 2022 European and North American tour. She followed it up with "The Only Heartbreaker" on November 9, 2021. The same day, Mitski announced her sixth studio album, Laurel Hell, would be released just before her European and North American tour, on February 4, 2022, called Laurel Hell Tour. On December 7, 2021, "Heat Lightning" was released as the third single from the album. On January 12, 2022, "Love Me More" followed as the fourth single from Laurel Hell. In March 2022, "The Only Heartbreaker" peaked at number-one on the Billboard Adult Alternative Airplay chart. On March 4, 2022, Mitski was announced as one of the performers for the Glastonbury Festival, scheduled for June 22–26, 2022.

On April 19, 2022, Mitski's cover of "Glide", from the soundtrack of All About Lily Chou Chou, was released on streaming services. The song was previously available as a bonus track on physical versions of Laurel Hell and was used in the 2022 film After Yang. Mitski appears on the song "This Is a Life" from the soundtrack for the 2022 film Everything Everywhere All at Once. The song also features David Byrne, and Son Lux, for which she was nominated for a Academy Award for Best Original song of 2023.

Musical style 
Mitski's lyrics often explore her anxieties and have been described by some as 'sad indie girl music,' a category into which many women who write emotional lyrics are put. E. Alex Jung described her as "an artist whose music feels like being ushered into a private opera house of melodrama" with lyrics full of "roiling fury, destructive impulses, humiliation, longing, heartache, and hunger". Angie Martoccio of Rolling Stone described her earlier albums as a "wry running commentary on twentysomething angst, raw desire, and often unrequited love". Lucy Dacus, a singer-songwriter who has at times opened for Mitski, described her music as "really visceral ... She’s connected to a part in herself that wants to scream. Maybe you don’t live in a space where you can scream, or maybe you don’t have the words for what has happened to you. Mitski provides a space for that."

Similarly, Mitski has described her music as a place where people "can put all of their feelings, their ugliness, that doesn’t have a place in their own lives."

Public image 
In a 2016 interview with The New York Times, Mitski expressed the tension of being a private person and her discomfort with the attention that comes with being in the public eye, therefore preferring to keep her personal life private. Since her breakthrough in 2014, she has often been described as private by the press.

As an Asian American woman, Mitski has felt pressure to represent her community. She has expressed discomfort at the idea of people looking to her for guidance and seeing her as a leader of change in an industry dominated by white men.

Mitski is not active on social media, and the accounts under her name are run by a manager. She left social media in 2019, around the same time she quit music, because she felt it was unhealthy for her self-image. However, she has gained massive popularity on social media. As of February 2022, her music has been featured in over 2.5 million videos on TikTok. Former President of the United States Barack Obama included "The Only Heartbreaker" in his list of top songs of 2021, a list he tweets out every year.

Views on the music industry 
On September 9, 2019, at a show in Central Park, Mitski announced it would be her last show indefinitely, causing her fanbase to express their distress on social media. The reaction online to this announcement prompted her to tell her fans she was not going to quit music; however, at the time, she truly intended to quit music for good. She has stated her main reason for quitting was that she had a difficult time grappling with newfound indie stardom when her 2018 album Be the Cowboy hit the mainstream. She said the music industry felt like a "super-saturated version of consumerism", and that in the industry "you have to be a product that’s being bought and sold and consumed". She regrets using her actual name to release music because it no longer felt like it belonged to her, and she felt like "a foreigner" to herself. She feared that by continuing to make music, eventually she would begin to create music she did not care about. In 2019, Mitski wrote a new single, "Working for the Knife", where she describes her "reluctance to return to the stage". In February 2022, Mitski released a new record Laurel Hell, returning to the music industry.

Views on her fanbase 
Mitski has stated in interviews that she has an uneasy relationship with her fans because she finds their relationship to her and her music overwhelming. She found the "worshipful commentary" about herself online damaging to her self-image. Her fanbase has been described as both "extremely online", "cultish", and as rivaling "Taylor Swift and BTS in intensity, if not size."

In an interview in 2022 she described the audience at one of her shows as "unrelenting. Everyone needed a piece of me ... I was so overwhelmed by hands grabbing at me that I was crying." In February 2022, Mitski tweeted out a statement asking fans to stop using their phones to record her shows, as "... it makes me feel as though we are not here together ... When I’m on stage and look to you but you are gazing into a screen, it makes me feel as though those of us on stage are being taken from and consumed as content, instead of getting to share a moment with you.”

Personal life
Mitski reflects her eclectic cross-cultural identity as "half Japanese, half American but not fully either", a feeling that is often reflected in her music, which occasionally discusses issues of belonging. Mitski has described herself as Asian American, but does not necessarily think of herself that way, as "she would just say she's American".

Since 2020, Mitski has resided in Nashville, Tennessee. She is vegan, likes horror films, and has two pet cats.

Discography

 Lush (2012)
 Retired from Sad, New Career in Business (2013)
 Bury Me at Makeout Creek (2014)
 Puberty 2 (2016)
 Be the Cowboy (2018)
 Laurel Hell (2022)

Awards and nominations

References

Further reading

External links

 

1990 births
Living people
American indie rock musicians
American folk musicians
American punk rock musicians
Art pop musicians
American women musicians of Japanese descent
Musicians from New York City
State University of New York at Purchase alumni
21st-century American women singers
21st-century American singers
American women songwriters
Dead Oceans artists
Don Giovanni Records artists
Hunter College alumni
Japanese emigrants to the United States
American expatriates in Turkey
American expatriates in China
American expatriates in Malaysia
American expatriates in the Democratic Republic of the Congo
Asian American music
Women punk rock singers